Lancaster is an unparished area in the City of Lancaster, Lancashire, England. It contains over 330 buildings that are recorded in the National Heritage List for England. Of these, four are listed at Grade I, the highest of the three grades, 24 are at Grade II*, the middle grade, and the others are at Grade II, the lowest grade.

Lancaster has a long history and this is reflected in its listed buildings. The oldest listed structure is a portion of wall from a Roman fort, and Lancaster Castle dates from the middle of the 12th century. The town stands at the lowest crossing of the River Lune, and received its first borough charter in 1193. In addition to being a market town, it became the judicial centre of the county of Lancashire, the castle being converted to serve this purpose in the 18th century. Also in the 18th century, in order to trade with the Americas, St George's Quay, with its warehouses and houses, was developed. Towards the end of that century the Lancaster Canal was built, linking the town with Preston. In the 19th century, railways came to the town, including what is now the West Coast Main Line. During this century some industry, including cotton mills and the manufacture of linoleum, was established but never thrived. There are listed buildings related to all of these aspects of the town's history.

Almost all the listed buildings are constructed in local sandstone, and most have slate roofs. A high proportion of the listed buildings are houses, or originated as houses and were converted for other uses, particularly into shops and offices. An architectural practice was established in the town in 1836 by Edmund Sharpe, and continued in existence for over 100 years with a succession of partners, eventually closing as Austin and Paley in 1944; this practice was responsible for designing many buildings in the town, some of which are listed.

This list includes the listed buildings in the central part of the area, the boundaries of which are the railway on the west side, the Lancaster Canal on the south and east sides, and to the north, a line passing from west to east through the centre of Quay Meadow.

Key

Buildings

Notes and references

Notes

Citations

Sources

Lists of listed buildings in Lancashire
Buildings and structures in Lancaster, Lancashire